The 2018 Mountain West Conference women's soccer tournament was the postseason women's soccer tournament for the Mountain West Conference held from October 30 through November 3, 2018. The five-match tournament took place at Spartan Soccer Complex in San Jose, California. The six-team single-elimination tournament consisted of three rounds based on seeding from regular season conference play. The San Diego State Aztecs were the defending champions, but will not defend their title after having failed to qualify for the 2018 tournament. The San Jose State Spartans won the tournament with a 1–0 win over the New Mexico Lobos in the final. This was the second tournament championship for San Jose State, both of which have come under coach Lauren Hanson.

Bracket

Source:

Schedule

Quarterfinals

Semifinals

Final

Statistics

Goalscorers
2 Goals
 Jill Olguin - New Mexico

1 Goal
 Kristen Amarikwa - San Jose St
 Jamilecxth Becerra  - San Jose St
 Jaelyn Hendren - New Mexico
 Gabriela Herrera - San Jose St
 Alesia Garcia - New Mexico
 Robyn McCarthy - Fresno State
 Lauren Millet - Colorado College
 Jennifer Munoz - New Mexico
 Addison Standlee - Boise State
 Michaela Stark - Wyoming
 Kiley Suter - Colorado College
 Haleigh Wynne - San Jose St

All-Tournament team

Source:

References

Mountain West Conference Women's Soccer Tournament
2018 Mountain West Conference women's soccer season